Brown syndrome is a rare form of strabismus characterized by limited elevation of the affected eye. The disorder may be congenital (existing at or before birth), or acquired. Brown syndrome is caused by a malfunction of the superior oblique muscle, causing the eye to have difficulty moving up, particularly during adduction (when eye turns towards the nose). Harold W. Brown first described the disorder in 1950 and initially named it the "superior oblique tendon sheath syndrome".

Presentation
A simple definition of the syndrome is "limited elevation in adduction from mechanical causes around the superior oblique". This definition indicates that when the head is upright, the eye is restricted in movement due to problems with muscles and tendons that surround the eye.

Harold W. Brown characterized the syndrome in many ways such as:
 Limited elevation in the eye when head is straight up
 Eyes point out in a straight up gaze (divergence in up gaze)
 Widening of the eyelids in the affected eye on adduction
 Head tilts backwards (compensatory chin elevation to avoid double vision)
 Near normal elevation in abduction

He concluded that all of these features of Brown syndrome were due to the shortening or tightening of the anterior superior oblique tendon. Because this syndrome can be acquired or occur at random and has spontaneous resolution, Brown hypothesized one major truth for this disorder — that the short tendon sheath was due to a complete separation, congenital paresis, of the ipsilateral (on the same side) inferior oblique muscle and secondary to a permanent shortening.

After further research, he redefined the sheath syndrome into the following divisions: true sheath syndrome, which categorized only the cases that had a congenital short anterior sheath of the superior oblique tendon, and simulated sheath syndrome, which characterized all cases in which the clinical features of a sheath syndrome caused by something different other than a congenital short anterior sheath of the tendon. The clinical features of the two categories are correct but true sheath syndrome is always congenital. However, in 1970 it was discovered that a tight sheath tendon was not the cause of Brown Syndrome. The real cause was a tight or short superior oblique tendon; studies have confirmed this and have labeled the tendon inelastic.

Causes
Brown syndrome can be divided in two categories based on the restriction of movement on the eye itself and how it affects the eye excluding the movement:
 Congenital (present at birth) Brown syndrome results from structural anomalies other than a short tendon sheath but other fibrous adhesions may be present around the trochlear area.
 Acquired cases arise from trauma, surgery, sinusitis and inflammation of the superior oblique tendon sheath in rheumatoid arthritis. Orbital floor fractures may trap the orbital tissue in such a way as to simulate Brown syndrome. Intermittent forms of vertical retraction syndrome have been associated with click, which occurs as the restriction is released (superior oblique click syndrome).

Diagnosis
Diagnosis of Brown syndrome usually happens during a routine ophthalmologic appointment.

Treatments
If binocular vision is present and head position is correct, treatment is not obligatory.
Treatment is required for: visual symptoms, strabismus, or incorrect head position.

Acquired cases that have active inflammation of the superior oblique tendon may benefit from local corticosteroid injections in the region of the trochlea.

The goal of surgery is to restore free ocular rotations. Various surgical techniques have been used: 
 Harold Brown advocated that the superior oblique tendon be stripped. A procedure named sheathotomy. The results of such a procedure are frequently unsatisfactory because of reformation of scar tissue.
 Tenotomy of the superior oblique tendon (with or without a tendon spacer) has also been advocated. This has the disadvantage that it frequently produces a superior oblique paresis.
 Weakening of the inferior oblique muscle of the affected eye may be needed to compensate for iatrogenic fourth nerve palsy.

During surgery, a traction test is repeated until the eye rotations are free and the eye is anchored in an elevated adducted position for about two weeks after the surgery. This maneuver is intended to prevent the reformation of scar tissue in the same places. Normalization of head position may occur but restoration of full motility is seldom achieved. A second procedure may be required.

Epidemiology
In Brown's original series there was a 3:2 predominance of women to men and nearly twice as many cases involved the right eye as the left. 10% of cases showed bilaterality. Familial occurrence of Brown syndrome has been reported.

See also
 Strabismus
 Strabismus surgery
 Pediatric ophthalmology
 Duane syndrome

References

External links 

Disorders of ocular muscles, binocular movement, accommodation and refraction
Syndromes affecting the eye
Rare syndromes